Uzu Keobukseon (우주거북선) (Space Turtle Ship) is a vertical scrolling shooter video game developed by Samsung in 1992 for the Sega Mega Drive, released only in Korea (the entire menu and dialogue was written in Korean). Players controlled the title ship, a purple and gold space-age battle cruiser designed as a turtle ship, complete with sails and oars, in eight various stages.

Gameplay
While the game has a similar look and stage presentation to Toaplan shooters on the same console, the gameplay is similar to that of a shooter from Compile.

With each weapon the player collects, the ship earns an extra hit. Once the ship is hit by an attack, the ship degrades to the next selected weapon until the ship is down to its default weapon. The player can collect various power-ups for the Turtleship including Speed and Weapon power-ups. The ship has three weapons to select from including its default Normal Shot which spread out to seven shots when upgraded, a Ring shot which fired behind and in front of the ship and a Wave shot which fires the strongest. The player ship is also equipped with bombs and during every boss fight an energy meter shows up to display how much health the boss has left, although a Checkpoint system is active.

References

1992 video games
Scrolling shooters
Sega Genesis games
Sega Genesis-only games
Video games developed in South Korea
South Korea-exclusive video games